Shooting at the 1992 Summer Paralympics consisted of 16 events.

Medal summary

Medal table

References 

 

1992 Summer Paralympics events
1992
Paralympics
Shooting competitions in Spain